was a Japanese gymnast who competed in the 1952 Summer Olympics.

References

1921 births
1986 deaths
Japanese male artistic gymnasts
Olympic gymnasts of Japan
Gymnasts at the 1952 Summer Olympics
Olympic silver medalists for Japan
Olympic bronze medalists for Japan
Olympic medalists in gymnastics
Medalists at the 1952 Summer Olympics
20th-century Japanese people